Puntius crescentus is a species of ray-finned fish in the genus Puntius. It is endemic off India.

References 

Puntius
Fish described in 1994
Barbs (fish)